Vellezzo Bellini is a comune (municipality) in the Province of Pavia in the Italian region Lombardy, located about 25 km south of Milan and about 10 km northwest of Pavia. As of 31 December 2004, it had a population of 2,565 and an area of 7.9 km2.

Vellezzo Bellini borders the following municipalities: Battuda, Certosa di Pavia, Giussago, Marcignago, Rognano.

Demographic evolution

References

Cities and towns in Lombardy